Donington is a hamlet and civil parish in Shropshire, England. It shares a parish council with the neighbouring parish of Boscobel, due to the latter's small population.

Geography

The hamlet is situated on the northern outskirts of the large village of Albrighton.

The parish is geographically large however and includes Cosford and DSAE Cosford, as well as encompassing a small part of the village of Albrighton (close to the railway station). The M54 motorway passes through the parish, as does the Wolverhampton to Shrewsbury Line and Albrighton railway station is on the border of the parishes of Donington and Albrighton, as is the Donington and Albrighton Nature Reserve. Wigmore Wood lies in the parish. Donington is located 9.9 miles away from Wolverhampton and 10.6 miles away from Telford

To the east of the parish is Staffordshire.

St. Cuthbert's Church

St. Cuthbert's Church in Donington is over 900 years old. It was founded by Roger de Montgomery. The old church tower had collapsed on 25 March 1879, and was rebuilt in 1880. Different parts of the church are from different eras. For example, the lower part of the tower is from the 12th Century and other areas being built in the 17th and 18th centuries.

This Church is also a grade II listed building and has been since 26 September 1984.

Many air force personnel from RAF Cosford are buried in the churchyard, 23 of them in World War II Commonwealth service war graves marked and cared for by the Commonwealth War Graves Commission (CWGC). Also buried from the same war are four Polish airmen. The dead include former British Olympic fencer Group Captain Frederick Sherriff. The CWGC also register the graves of two British Army officers of World War I.

Population trends

In 1801, the recorded population for the parish of Donington was 289 people. The population has steadily increased over the years except for some decades such as the 1850s. After World War II the population for this parish has risen from a pre-war figure of 329 to over 3000 in the 1950s. According to census records from the 1800s into the 1930s the ratio of males and females living within Donington were roughly the same, until after World War II when the parish saw a large increase in the male population in the area. This is because of the location of RAF Cosford which is included within the Donington parish. The 2001 census also shows the number of people in different age groups. The census shows us that for the Donington area
the most populated age group was 16–24. This could be because the RAF base at Cosford is included in these data statistics. In general though, the 2001 census shows that there are more people living in the parish under the age of 44, than there are over that age.

Employment

According to the 1881 census the main sources of employment within Donington was either in Agriculture or in Domestic services. The same census also states how that these jobs were mainly dominated by men and that for most women living in Donington at the time had no employment. In comparison, the 2001 census shows that the employment structure has changed compared to that of 1881. The 2001 census shows that now over 2600 people now work in the service sector, and around 100 people now work in agriculture and manufacturing. There could be many reasons as to why there has been such a dramatic switch in terms of employment over the last 120 years, but it does follow the national trend for local parishes in terms of employment.

Housing

Shackerley Hall is a small country house incorporating the remains of an 18th-century house; it is a listed building.

The first UK census which included people's housing situation was in 1891. In the 1891 census questions were focused on the number of rooms in your house and the number of people who lived there as well, however from the 1951 census questions focused more on the facilities within a house. In 1891 there were 87  houses within the parish and Donington and that number in the 2001 census has risen to 587. In March 2012, according to Zoopla.com the average house price for the postcode WV7, which Donington and the rest of the parish fall under, was £215,074

See also
Listed buildings in Donington, Shropshire

References

Hamlets in Shropshire
Civil parishes in Shropshire